is a Japanese manga series written and illustrated by Tetsuya Chiba, serialized in Weekly Shōnen Magazine in 1965. It was the first manga to be reprinted as a tankōbon in 1967 as part of the Kodansha Comics series.

Plot
The story follows Kunimatsu Ishida, a troublesome school boy who continuously gets expelled from schools for fighting other students. His next school is Harris Academy, where the principal convinces him to join various sports teams. Kunimatsu channels his anger into sports while also realizing he is a great athlete.

Characters
Kunimatsu Ishida

Voiced by: Nobuyo Oyama

Principal of Harris Academy

Voiced by: Genzo Wakamiya

Yoko Asai

Voiced by: Minori Matsushima

Gouzou Iwanami

Voiced by: Nobuo Tanaka

Megane

Voiced by: Noriko Ohara

Abou Ishida

Voiced by: Yoshiko Yamamoto

Anime
An anime adaptation was made in 1966. The series is in monochrome. The opening and ending themes are by Gacha Torian.

A remake was made in 1971 by Tezuka Productions and retitled  The opening theme is Kunimatsu-sama no Otoridai by Kyoko Yamamoto and the ending theme is Gyakuten no Ouen Uta by Yuri Shimazaki and Vocal Shop.

References

External links
 

Kodansha manga
Shōnen manga
Anime series
Anime series based on manga
Fuji TV original programming
Mushi Production